The Nordgeorgsfehn Canal ( or NGFK) is a canal in East Frisia, Lower Saxony, Germany. It connects the Jümme with the Ems-Jade Canal.  It is 31.8 km long and 13 m wide. The maximum permitted draught of boats on the canal is 1.4 m and the maximum permitted height is 2.2 m. The canal has eight locks and twenty five bridges of which ten are swing bridges.

The canal is owned by the state of Lower Saxony and is operated by NLWKN.

References

Canals in Lower Saxony
Canals opened in 1829
Canals opened in 1916